Rece Buckmaster (born July 7, 1996) is an American soccer player who currently plays for Memphis 901 in the USL Championship.

Career

Youth and college 
Buckmaster attended Canterbury High School. Buckmaster played four years of college soccer at Indiana University between 2015 and 2018, making 82 appearances, scoring 5 goals and tallying 12 assists.

While at college, Buc appeared for USL Premier Development League side Chicago FC United in 2016.

Professional 
On January 11, 2019, Buckmaster was selected 32nd overall in the 2019 MLS SuperDraft by New York Red Bulls. On March 5, 2019, Buckmaster signed for the Red Bulls' USL Championship affiliate side New York Red Bulls II. On March 9, 2019 he made his professional debut with the club, appearing as a starter in a 3-1 victory over Swope Park Rangers.

On August 3, 2019, Buckmaster moved to the New York Red Bulls senior squad. Buckmaster made his debut for the first team on the same day, playing all 90 minutes of a 2-0 victory over Toronto FC.

On February 29, 2020, the opening day of the season, Buckmaster was waived by New York Red Bulls.

Buckmaster signed with USL Championship side Memphis 901 on July 13, 2020.

On January 6, 2021, Buckmaster moved to USL Championship club Indy Eleven. Following the 2021 season, it was announced that Buckmaster's contract option was declined by Indy Eleven.

Buckmaster returned to Memphis 901 on January 18, 2022.

References

External links 
 Rece Buckmaster - Men's Soccer Indiana bio
 

1996 births
Living people
American soccer players
Association football defenders
Chicago FC United players
Indiana Hoosiers men's soccer players
Indy Eleven players
Memphis 901 FC players
New York Red Bulls draft picks
New York Red Bulls II players
New York Red Bulls players
People from Auburn, Indiana
Soccer players from Indiana
USL Championship players
USL League Two players
Major League Soccer players
People from Fort Wayne, Indiana